Monkeyface or monkey-face may refer to:
 Monkeyface prickleback (Cebidichthys violaceus), a North Pacific species of fish
 Appalachian monkeyface (Quadrula sparsa), a North American species of freshwater mussel
 Cumberland monkeyface (Quadrula intermedia), a North American species of freshwater mussel
 Rio Grande monkeyface (Quadrula couchiana), a North American species of freshwater mussel

Animal common name disambiguation pages